Squiggle may refer to:

Another name for the ASCII character tilde (~)
Diacritical mark
Mr. Squiggle, Australian children's TV puppet and show of the same name
"Squiggle", nickname of the character Libby Fox in British TV soap EastEnders